Pius Krätschmer (born 16 June 1997) is a German professional footballer who plays as a centre-back for 1. FC Saarbrücken.

Career
Krätschmer made his professional debut for 1. FC Nürnberg in the 2. Bundesliga on 10 May 2021, coming on as a substitute in the 83rd minute for Nikola Dovedan against Hamburger SV. The away match finished as a 5–2 loss for Nürnberg.

References

External links
 
 
 
 

1997 births
Living people
Sportspeople from Ulm
German footballers
Footballers from Baden-Württemberg
Association football central defenders
2. Bundesliga players
3. Liga players
Regionalliga players
Karlsruher SC II players
TSV 1860 Rosenheim players
1. FC Schweinfurt 05 players
1. FC Nürnberg players
1. FC Saarbrücken players